Mike Haffner is an American politician and businessman serving as a member of the Missouri House of Representatives from the 55th district. Elected in November 2018, he assumed office in 2019.

Education 
Haffner earned a Bachelor of Business Administration with an emphasis in accounting from Cleveland State University and a Master of Science in national security and strategic studies from the Naval War College.

Career 
Haffner served as a pilot in the United States Navy before his retirement. During his career, Haffner was a commanding officer of an McDonnell Douglas F/A-18 Hornet and led combat air patrols over New York City after the September 11 attacks. Since retiring from the Navy, Haffner has operated a Christmas tree farm. He was elected to the Missouri House of Representatives in November 2018 and assumed office in 2019. Haffner is chair of the House Agriculture Committee and vice chair of the House Elementary and Secondary Education Committee.

Electoral History

References 

Living people
Cleveland State University alumni
Naval War College alumni
Missouri Republicans
Members of the Mississippi House of Representatives
People from Cass County, Missouri
Year of birth missing (living people)